P. S. Nathan, P. Susai Nathan or P. Susainathan (18 April 1891 – 17 March 1976) was an Indian naturalist, entomologist and a natural history specimen collector and dealer. His natural history business was continued by his daughter-in-law Theresa Rajabai Susai Nathan and still later by her daughter-in-law Nellie J.P. Nathan. A number of species are named after the collections made by him and his family.

Life and work 
Nathan came from Kurumbagaram, Nedungadu, near Karaikal. The initial "P." stands for his father's name Prabalanathan, although some sources note it incorrectly as "Peter". He collected insects while still in school and became a government entomologist and later an entomological assistant at the Coimbatore Agricultural College (now the Tamil Nadu Agricultural University). He then worked at Basra, Iraq under the British as a port officer working in quarantine service. He retired voluntarily in 1929 to become a professional insect collector and natural history dealer. He was elected Fellow of the Entomological Society in 1919. Although he specialized mainly in insects he also sold mollusc shells across Europe and North America and numerous species have been described on the basis of specimens collected by him, several named after him, including:

 Nathanella . (Ephemeroptera) 
Petersula nathani  (Ephemeroptera) 
Ephemera nathani  (Ephemeroptera) 
Bolivaritettix nathani  (Orthoptera: Tetrigidae) 
 Diplatys nathani  .  (Dermaptera) 
 Gonolabidura nathani  . (Dermaptera) 
Timmomenus nathani  (Dermaptera: Forficulidae) 
Dysaulophthalma nathani  (Mantodea: Tarachodidae) 
Calamothespis nathani  (Mantodea) [from Zambia, 27 Dec 1970] 
Aphelocheirus nathani  (Heteroptera: Naucoridae) 
Onychomesa susainathani  (Heteroptera: Reduviidae) 
Stenolemus susainathani  (Heteroptera: Reduviidae) 
Scaphidium nathani . (Coleoptera: Staphylinidae) 
Autoserica nathani  (Coleoptera: Scarabeidae)
Myllocerus susainathani  (Coleoptera: Curculionidae)
Notosacantha nathani  (Coleoptera: Chrysomelidae) 
Lycostomus nathani  (Coleoptera: Lycidae) 
Nosodendron nathani   (Coleoptera: Nosodendridae, named after T.R.S. Nathan) 
Pachynomia nathani  (Hymenoptera: Halictidae) 
Maynenomia nathani  (Hymenoptera: Halictidae) 
Lasioglossum (Ipomalictus) nathanae  (Hymenoptera: Halictidae, named after Mrs. T.R.S. Nathan) 
Entomognathus nathani  (Hymenoptera: Crabronidae)
 Kristotomus nathani  (Hymenoptera: Ichneumonidae)
Teucholabis (Teucholabis) susainathani  (Diptera: Tipuloidea)
Boettcherisca nathani  (Diptera: Sarcophagidae) 
Sarcophaga (Sarcosolomonia) susainathani  (Diptera: Sarcophagidae) 
Sarcosolomonia (Parkerimyia) nathani  (Diptera: Sarcophagidae) 
Laphria nathani  (Diptera: Asilidae, after T.R.S. Nathan) 
Stenopogon nathani  (Diptera: Asilidae) 
Haematopota nathani  (Diptera: Tabanidae) 
Chersonesometrus nathanorum  (Arachnida: Scorpiones, after P.S. and T.R.S. Nathan)
Alexander named a cranefly Styringomyia susilae after his then infant daughter. After his retirement from active collecting in 1969, his daughter-in-law Theresa Rajabai Susai Nathan (T.R.S. Nathan was married to S.J. Selva Nathan at the Sugarcane Breeding Institute, Coimbatore) continued the natural history specimen business. The tiger beetle Cicindela nathanae is named after her but not all species described after her have been correctly formed with the feminine form. In 1993 T.R.S. Nathan handed the collecting business to her daughter-in-law Nellie J.P. Nathan and a nephew of T.R.S. Nathan, S.A. Surender also collected specimens. The tiger beetle species Jansenia nathanorum was named for the Nathan family by Fabio Cassola and Karl Werner in 2003. A specimen collected in 1970 indicates that P.S. Nathan collected briefly in Zambia.

Publications
 Some important pests of the Malay Peninsula. Proc. 5th Entom. Mtg. Pusa  p. 28-33, 1924
 The fruit moth problem in the northern Circars. Agric. J. India 19:402-4, 1924
 Fruit-sucking moths of South India. Proc. 5th Entomol. Mtg. Pusa p. 23-27. 1924
 With Y. Ramachandra Rao. A note on Paratelphusa hydrodromous Herbst, the freshwater crab of South India. Proc. 5th Entom. Mtg Pusa p. 136-40, 1924
 Birds friends and foes of farmers. Bull. Dept. Agric. Madras 81:24, 1921
 Ayyar, T.V.R., Muliyil, J.A. and Susainathan, P. (1918) A Preliminary investigation of "pollu" disease of pepper in north Malabar in 1918. Madras Agric. Year Book, 1920-21 pp. 18–31.

References

External links 
 A list of specimens collected by Nathan

Indian entomologists
1891 births
1976 deaths